Cutting Our Teeth is the debut studio album by English post-hardcore band We Are the Ocean, after releasing two EPs. Promotional videos have been made for the songs "These Days, I Have Nothing" and "Look Alive". A video for "All of This Has to End" was recently made and has been highly requested on the Scuzz and Kerrang! music channels. It features noticeably change in Dan Brown's vocal style from the self-titled EP. "Cutting Our Teeth" was re-issued with a bonus disc including 4 previously unreleased songs and 9 previously released songs from the band's two previous EPs.

The deluxe edition CD featured four new songs produced by Jason Wilson at Stakeout Studios, in addition to the previously sold out 2008 mini-album.

Although the title track does not appear on the regular edition of the album, it was released before the album on the Look Alive EP, and was included in the album's deluxe edition bonus disc.

Track listing

Personnel
 Dan Brown – unclean vocals
 Liam Cromby – clean vocals, rhythm guitar
 Alfie Scully – lead guitar
 Jack Spence  – bass guitar
 Tom Whittaker – drums

References

2010 debut albums
We Are the Ocean albums
Hassle Records albums
Albums produced by Brian McTernan